Benjamin Stephen Hooper (March 6, 1835 – January 17, 1898) was an American farmer who served one term as a U.S. Representative from Virginia from 1883 to 1885.

Biography
Born near Buckingham, Virginia, Hooper attended the common schools. He engaged in mercantile pursuits and the manufacture of tobacco. He served in the Confederate States Army during the Civil War.

Hooper was elected as Readjuster to the Forty-eighth Congress (March 4, 1883 – March 3, 1885). After leaving Congress, he resumed mercantile pursuits at Farmville, Virginia. He served as delegate to the Republican National Convention in 1888. He died in Farmville on January 17, 1898. He was interred in the Farmville Cemetery.

Electoral history

1882: Hooper was elected to the U.S. House of Representatives with 75.46% of the vote, defeating Democrat William A. Reese and Republican Tazewell Branch.

Notes

References
 Retrieved on 2009-03-04

1835 births
1898 deaths
Republican Party members of the United States House of Representatives from Virginia
Confederate States Army soldiers
People of Virginia in the American Civil War
Readjuster Party members of the United States House of Representatives
Readjuster Party politicians
19th-century American politicians
Burials in Virginia
People from Buckingham, Virginia